Sardarnagar is a village and panchayat in Ranga Reddy district, Telangana, India. It falls under Shabad mandal.

Village Entrance:

Famous for Edla Angadi (aka Oxen market) and Angadi (weekly market).

This village has School, Temples, Bank and many more as common to other villages.

School:

ZPHS school located at the very entrance of the village.

Address:

Zilla Parishad High School (ZPHS), Sardarnagar, Kakloor-509217
Shabad (M) Ranga Reddy Telangana
Borad: State Board
Established: 1952

Medium: Telugu

Rural/Urban : Rural

Highest Class : 10

School Category : Higher Secondary

School Type : Co-ed

Edla Angadi:

This is oxen market. It happens every Tuesday of week. Farmers bring Oxen, Cows, Buffallows, also various other domestic animals like Goats, Donkeys, Horses for sale.

Angadi:

This is grains market. This too happens every Tuesday of week. Farmers from neighboring villages bring their yields for sale in this market.

Developments-2019

1. 30 Days Action Plan development works

Developments-2020 

Jan 19 - Pulse Polio Program  

Jan 23 - New LED street lights

Jan 25 - New uniform distribution to Gram Panchayat staff  

Jan 26 - Republic day celebrations 

Feb 02 - New Tractor for village development works 

 

 

Feb 14 - Remembers Pulwama martyrs

References

Villages in Ranga Reddy district